Guy-Marcelin Kilama Kilama (born 30 May 1999) is a Cameroonian professional footballer who plays for Chamois Niortais as a defender.

Professional career
On 30 January 2018, Kilama joined Chamois Niortais F.C. from EFBC from Cameroon, and can play in midfield and defense. He made his professional debut for Niort in a 4–2 Ligue 2 win over Clermont Foot on 2 August 2018, playing as a leftback.

International career
Kilama represented the Cameroon U23s at the 2019 Africa U-23 Cup of Nations.

Career statistics

Club

References

External links
 
 
 EFBC Profile

1999 births
Living people
Footballers from Douala
Cameroonian footballers
Cameroon youth international footballers
Association football defenders
Association football midfielders
Chamois Niortais F.C. players
Ligue 2 players
Championnat National 2 players
Cameroonian expatriate footballers
Cameroonian expatriate sportspeople in France
Expatriate footballers in France